Lamellidea subcylindrica is a species of air-breathing tropical land snails, terrestrial pulmonate gastropod mollusks in the family Achatinellidae. This species is found in Guam and the Northern Mariana Islands.

References

Lamellidea
Taxonomy articles created by Polbot